The 1985 SEC Men’s Basketball Tournament took place from March 6–9, 1985 at the Birmingham-Jefferson Convention Complex in Birmingham, Alabama. The Auburn Tigers men's basketball team won their first ever SEC Tournament title in the championship game on March 9, 1985. Auburn defeated Alabama 53–49 for the SEC's automatic bid to the 1985 NCAA Men’s Division I Basketball tournament.

Television coverage of the tournament’s first round, the quarterfinals, and semifinals were produced and regionally syndicated by the now-defunct Lorimar Sports Network (formerly Sports Productions, Inc.), the sports broadcasting arm of Lorimar Productions. The championship game was nationally televised on NBC via that network’s in-house sports division, NBC Sports.

Bracket

References

SEC men's basketball tournament
1984–85 Southeastern Conference men's basketball season
1985 in sports in Alabama
Basketball competitions in Birmingham, Alabama
College basketball tournaments in Alabama